Cascades Tower is a 20-storey residential building and a distinctive local landmark on the Isle of Dogs in East London. It was designed by Rex Wilkinson, a partner in the celebrated architectural firm CZWG, and built in 1987–88.

The building has a concrete frame with details inspired by riverside industry and nautical themes. It has 168 residential units.

Overlooking River Thames, Cascades Tower is on 4 Westferry Road, Canary Wharf, E14 8JL. It stands on land just south of the old western entrance to South Dock of the original West India Docks.

Cascade Tower was the first private high-rise housing development undertaken by The London Docklands Development Corporation (LDDC) to regenerate the depressed east London Docklands area. It was completed at a time “when high rise was still a discredited building form for residential purposes, and two or three storeys was the norm”. The building is an exemplary architecture project of British Post-Modernism style. 

Cascades was the Winner of Architectural Brickwork Award in 1989, and Grade II listed building in 2018.

References

External links 
 Postmodernism in London | Touring a two bed in Cascades TowerYouTube. Retrieved 11 Feb 2023
 

Canary Wharf buildings
Grade II listed buildings in the London Borough of Tower Hamlets
Architecture of London
Residential buildings completed in the 20th century
Millwall